Goleh Dam (also Romanized as Goleh Dām; also known as Gol Ādam) is a village in Shenetal Rural District, Kuhsar District, Salmas County, West Azerbaijan Province, Iran. At the 2006 census, its population was 181, in 35 families.

References 

Populated places in Salmas County